The 2014 Conference USA football season was a part of the 2014 NCAA Division I FBS football season and was played from August 2014 through January 2015. The 2014 football season marks the 20th season of the Conference USA's existence and 19th of football competition; although C-USA was established in 1995, it did not begin football competition until 1996.

Previous season

Rice won the conference championship for the first time, defeating Marshall 41–24.

2014 season

Before the season
Conference USA football added two new members in 2014 (Old Dominion (transitioning from FCS) and Western Kentucky (from the Sun Belt Conference)) and lost three from the previous season (East Carolina, Tulane, and Tulsa) to the American Athletic Conference.

In preseason polls, Marshall was favored to win the East Division and the 2014 conference title followed by North Texas to win the West Division. Marshall was also the only team in the conference to have received votes from the AP and Coaches' Poll Preseason Rankings before the season.

East Division
In the first East Division game of the season, Middle Tennessee defeated Western Kentucky 50–47 in triple overtime, bringing the Blue Raiders to the top of the division and the Hilltoppers to the bottom. A week later after the Blue Raiders defeated the Hilltoppers, newcomers Old Dominion defeated the last year conference champions Rice, putting the Monarchs to first in the east division surpassing Middle Tennessee. In the following week, Old Dominion received its first conference loss against Middle Tennessee, bringing the undefeated Blue Raiders back on top on the East Division standings. After winning 3 conference games, Middle Tennessee then lost for the first time in conference play to the undefeated Marshall Thundering Herd, the projected winner of the conference. Marshall would go on to become East Division champions after defeating the defending conference champions, Rice, and after FIU defeated Middle Tennessee to put the Thundering Herd into the conference championship for the second time in back to back seasons.

West Division
In the first conference game of the season, the projected division winner, North Texas lost 21–42 to Louisiana Tech, bringing the Bulldogs to the top of the division and the Mean Green to the bottom. Louisiana Tech would go on to win the West Division 7–1, with wins over North Texas, Southern Miss, UTEP, UTSA, Southern Miss, Western Kentucky, UAB, and Rice and with a loss to Old Dominion.

Championship Game
At the conclusion of the 2014 regular season the tenth C-USA championship game was played at Marshall on December 6, 2014 where the East Division Champs, Marshall, defeated the West Division Champs, Louisiana Tech, 26-23 to claim the conference championship.

After the season
On December 2, 2014, UAB announced that the school will be cutting their football program after the 2014 season.

Bowl games

Bowl eligibility

Bowl eligible
 Louisiana Tech
 Marshall
 Middle Tennessee
 Rice
 UAB
 UTEP
 Western Kentucky

Bowl ineligible
 Florida Atlantic
 Florida International
 North Texas
 Old Dominion
 Southern Miss
 UTSA

Results
Conference USA bowl games for the 2014 season are:

All times Eastern Time Zone.

Individual conference honors
2014 Conference Player of the Year and Coach of the Year awards

All-Conference players
Coaches All-Conference Selections

Attendance

Membership

East Carolina, Tulane, and Tulsa left Conference USA, and joined the American Athletic Conference, the football-sponsoring offshoot of the original Big East, on July 1, 2014.

Old Dominion, which had moved five of its sports from its former home of the Colonial Athletic Association to C-USA for the 2012–13 school year, moved the rest of its athletic program to C-USA. ODU has an established FCS program that played as an FCS independent in 2013, and will join C-USA football as a provisional FBS member in 2014, and become fully bowl-eligible in 2015. Also Western Kentucky will join the conference from the Sun Belt Conference on July 1, 2014. Charlotte, which is a football team, that is initially provisional FBS member in 2014 and will bring football to C-USA in 2015. The 49ers joined from the Atlantic 10 Conference.

With Old Dominion and Western Kentucky makes the conference at 13 teams which will be both in the East Division, while Southern Miss moves from the East Division to the West. The East division consist of 7 members while the West division consists of 6 members.

References